The calcaneocuboid ligament is a fibrous band that connects the superior surface of the calcaneus to the dorsal surface of the cuboid bone.

It forms part of the bifurcated ligament.

References 

Foot
Ligaments